Chittapur railway station, (station code:CT) is an Indian Railways train station located in Chitapur, Kalaburagi  in the Indian state of Karnataka and serves Chitapur area. It is located on the –Wadi line of Secunderabad railway division in South Central Railway zone.

History 
The Wadi–Secunderabad line was built in 1874 with financing by the Nizam of Hyderabad. It later became part of Nizam's Guaranteed State Railway

Structure and expansion 
Chittapur railway station has two platforms and four tracks each running to 650 meters in length, computerized reservation counter, waiting room, light refreshment stall and tea stall, parking, foot overbridge, waiting room, and toilet facilities. Chittapur has connectivity with Bengaluru, Pune, Hyderabad, Sainagar Shirdi, Latur, Aurangabad and Mumbai.

References

Secunderabad railway division
Railway stations in Kalaburagi district
Railway stations in Karnataka